Bitter Springs can refer to:

Places
Bitter Springs, Arizona, a place in Arizona
Bitter Springs (fossil locality), Australia 
Bitter Spring Valley, a valley in southeast Nevada, at Lake Mead

Other
Bitter Springs type preservation, preservation of microorganisms in silica
The Bitter Springs, English rock group
Bitter Springs (film), a 1950 film directed by Ralph Smart